James Sutherland (March 20, 1820October 30, 1905) was an American educator, historian, and Republican politician.  He was the 17th mayor of Janesville, Wisconsin, (1872–1874) and was an important leader in the development of the city's school system.  Earlier, he represented Rock County in the Wisconsin State Senate (1855–1859), where he led the effort to create the Wisconsin normal schools.

Biography
Sutherland was born on March 20, 1820, in Smithfield, Ohio. In December 1846, he married Elizabeth Withington. They had seven children. Sutherland moved to Janesville, Wisconsin in 1847. He was a member of the American Bible Society and Vice President of the Wisconsin Historical Society. He died in Janesville in 1905.

Career
Sutherland was a delegate to the Free Soil Party National Convention in 1852. In 1854, he took party in organizing the Republican Party of Wisconsin.

In 1848, Sutherland became Janesville's first Superintendent of Schools. He then went on to serve three terms in the Senate representing the 17th district. Later, he was elected Mayor of Janesville in 1872 and re-elected in 1873.

References

External links
 

People from Smithfield, Ohio
Politicians from Janesville, Wisconsin
Republican Party Wisconsin state senators
Mayors of places in Wisconsin
Wisconsin Free Soilers
19th-century American politicians
1820 births
1905 deaths